The Dolynske oil field is a Ukrainian oil field that was discovered in 1959. It began production in 1960 and produces oil.

In the 1960s it was the oil field that produced the largest amount of oil of the whole Soviet Union.  (Ukraine was part of the Soviet Union from 1920 till Ukraine declared its independence from the Soviet Union on 24 August 1991.) It is the most powerful oil field of Ivano-Frankivsk Oblast (region).

References

Oil fields in Ukraine
Oil fields of the Soviet Union